Bodaybo is a town and the administrative center of Bodaybinsky District in Irkutsk Oblast, Russia.

Geography 
The town is located in the Patom Highlands, on the right bank of the Vitim River at its confluence with the Bodaybo River. Besides Bodaybo, some of the settlements of the district are Aprilsk, Artyomovsky, Balakhninsky, Kropotkin, Mamakan, Svetly, Vasilievsky, Perevoz and Bolshoy Patom.

History
It was founded in 1864 and served the needs of the local gold mining industry. The Lena massacre took place near Bodaybo in 1912. It was granted town status in 1925.

Vitim event

The Vitim event occurred on September 25, 2002 near the town. It was believed to be caused by a bolide or a comet nucleus impact.

Administrative and municipal status
Within the framework of administrative divisions, Bodaybo serves as the administrative center of Bodaybinsky District, to which it is directly subordinated. As a municipal division, the town of Bodaybo, together with the selo of Nerpo in Bodaybinsky District, is incorporated within Bodaybinsky Municipal District as Bodaybinskoye Urban Settlement.

Transportation
The Bodaybo Airport is the only airport in Bodaybo and is quite small. It is served by Angara Airlines which flies only to Irkutsk.

Climate
Bodaybo has a subarctic climate (Köppen climate classification Dfc), with bitterly cold winters and warm summers. Precipitation is quite low, but falls mostly in summer, with the climate being arid at other times of the year.

References

Notes

Sources

Registry of the Administrative-Territorial Formations of Irkutsk Oblast

External links
Official website of Bodaybo 
Bodaybo Business Directory 

Cities and towns in Irkutsk Oblast
Populated places established in 1864
Irkutsk Governorate
Gold mines in Russia
Gold mines in the Soviet Union